1870 West Sydney colonial by-election may refer to:

 1870 West Sydney colonial by-election 1 held on 2 March 1870
 1870 West Sydney colonial by-election 2 held on 30 December 1870

See also
 List of New South Wales state by-elections